George Stoney may refer to:

 George Johnstone Stoney (1826–1911), Irish physicist, introduced the term electron
 George C. Stoney (1916–2012), New York University professor of communications, the father of public-access television